Petryayevo is a rural locality (a village) in Baydarovskoye Rural Settlement, Nikolsky District, Vologda Oblast, Russia. The population was 29 as of 2002.

Geography 
Petryayevo is located 13 km northeast of Nikolsk (the district's administrative centre) by road. Shalashnevo is the nearest rural locality.

References 

Rural localities in Nikolsky District, Vologda Oblast